Traffic in Hearts is a 1924 American silent drama film directed by Scott R. Dunlap and starring Robert Frazer, Mildred Harris, and Marion Feducha.

Synopsis
A man plans to build modern tenement buildings, but is opposed by his girlfriend's father who has a vested interest in preventing change.

Cast
 Robert Frazer as Lawrence Hallor 
 Mildred Harris as Alice Hamilton 
 Marion Feducha as Shrimp 
 Charles Wellesley as John Hamilton 
 John Herdman as Dad Clark 
 Betty Morrissey as Jerry

References

Bibliography
 Munden, Kenneth White. The American Film Institute Catalog of Motion Pictures Produced in the United States, Part 1. University of California Press, 1997.

External links

1924 films
1924 drama films
Silent American drama films
Films directed by Scott R. Dunlap
American silent feature films
1920s English-language films
American black-and-white films
Columbia Pictures films
1920s American films